KF Tearca–97 is a football club based in the municipality of Tearce, Tetovo, North Macedonia. They recently competed in the Macedonian Third League.

History
The club was founded in 1997.

References

External links
Tearca-97 Facebook 
Club info at MacedonianFootball 
Football Federation of Macedonia 

Tearca-97
Association football clubs established in 1997
1997 establishments in the Republic of Macedonia
FK
Tearca